Christoph Koschel (born 9 April 1976) is a German dressage rider. He competed at the 2010 World Equestrian Games and the 2011 European Dressage Championships. At both occasions he won a medal in team competition (bronze in 2010, silver in 2011). Meanwhile, his current best individual result is 6th place in freestyle competition, achieved at the 2010 World Games.

References

External links
 

Living people
1976 births
German male equestrians
German dressage riders